Southern Natural Pipeline (Sonat) is a natural gas pipeline system which brings gas from the Louisiana Gulf of Mexico coast to the southeastern United States.  It also has a connection to the Elba Island LNG terminal in Georgia.  It is owned by Kinder Morgan and is part of its Birmingham, Alabama based Southern Natural Gas division.  Its FERC code is 6.

External links
Pipeline Electronic Bulletin Board

Natural gas pipelines in the United States
Energy infrastructure in Alabama
Companies based in Birmingham, Alabama
Kinder Morgan
Natural gas pipelines in Texas
Natural gas pipelines in Louisiana
Natural gas pipelines in Mississippi
Natural gas pipelines in Alabama
Natural gas pipelines in Georgia (U.S. state)
Natural gas pipelines in Florida